The Minister for Economic Development is a minister in the government of New Zealand with the responsibility of promoting development of New Zealand's economy, and is in charge of the Ministry of Business, Innovation and Employment. The position was established in 1999.

The present Minister is Stuart Nash.

History
At its establishment, the Minister for Economic Development was the lead minister for the Ministry of Economic Development, which was established out of the former Ministry of Commerce as part of the Labour-Alliance coalition agreement.

From 1 July 2012, the Minister assumed responsibility for the new Ministry of Business, Innovation and Employment following the merger of the Ministry of Economic Development with several other government agencies.

The position was briefly renamed Minister for Economic and Regional Development after being merged with the standalone Regional Economic Development in 2020. In early 2023 the portfolio was split back into two, and its name reverted back to Minister for Economic Development.

Similar ministerial roles under previous governments include the Minister for Enterprise and Commerce (1998–1999), the Minister of Trade and Industry (1972–1988) and the Minister of Industries and Commerce (1894–1972).

List of Ministers
Key

A.Carter was appointed as Acting Minister of Economic Development following the 2011 Christchurch earthquake and Brownlee's increased workload as Minister for Christchurch Earthquake Recovery (to which he had been appointed in September 2010 after the 2010 Christchurch earthquake). However, Brownlee retained his warrant as Minister of Economic Development until after the 2011 general election.

References

External links
New Zealand Ministry for Business, Employment and Innovation

Economic Development
Economy of New Zealand